Vlasios Maras (born 31 March 1983 in Athens) is a Greek gymnast. 

In the 2004 Summer Olympics, he was a favorite in the horizontal bar competition but failed to qualify for the final after finishing 13th in the qualification round. He competed in the horizontal bar event at the 2016 Summer Olympics in Rio de Janeiro as well, but finished in 38th place in qualifying and did not advance to the final.

Maras is a two-time world champion on horizontal bar and a five-time European champion. He was named the 2009 Greek Male Athlete of the Year.

References

External links
 
 
 

1983 births
Living people
Gymnasts at the 2004 Summer Olympics
Gymnasts at the 2008 Summer Olympics
Gymnasts at the 2012 Summer Olympics
Gymnasts at the 2016 Summer Olympics
Olympic gymnasts of Greece
Greek male artistic gymnasts
World champion gymnasts
Medalists at the World Artistic Gymnastics Championships
Gymnasts at the 2015 European Games
European Games medalists in gymnastics
European Games competitors for Greece
Mediterranean Games gold medalists for Greece
Mediterranean Games medalists in gymnastics
Competitors at the 2001 Mediterranean Games
European champions in gymnastics
20th-century Greek people
21st-century Greek people
Gymnasts from Athens